Hyperosmolar hyperglycemic state (HHS) is a complication of diabetes mellitus in which high blood sugar results in high osmolarity without significant ketoacidosis. Symptoms include signs of dehydration, weakness, leg cramps, vision problems, and an altered level of consciousness. Onset is typically over days to weeks. Complications may include seizures, disseminated intravascular coagulopathy, mesenteric artery occlusion, or rhabdomyolysis.

The main risk factor is a history of diabetes mellitus type 2. Occasionally it may occur in those without a prior history of diabetes or those with diabetes mellitus type 1. Triggers include infections, stroke, trauma, certain medications, and heart attacks. Diagnosis is based on blood tests finding a blood sugar greater than 30 mmol/L (600 mg/dL), osmolarity greater than 320 mOsm/kg, and a pH above 7.3.

Initial treatment generally consists of intravenous fluids to manage dehydration, intravenous insulin in those with significant ketones, low molecular weight heparin to decrease the risk of blood clotting, and antibiotics among those in whom there are concerns of infection. The goal is a slow decline in blood sugar levels. Potassium replacement is often required as the metabolic problems are corrected. Efforts to prevent diabetic foot ulcers are also important. It typically takes a few days for the person to return to baseline.

While the exact frequency of the condition is unknown, it is relatively common. Older people are most commonly affected. The risk of death among those affected is about 15%. It was first described in the 1880s.

Signs and symptoms
Symptoms of high blood sugar including increased thirst (polydipsia), increased volume of urination (polyuria), and increased hunger (polyphagia).

Symptoms of HHS include:
 Altered level of consciousness
 Neurologic signs including: blurred vision, headaches, focal seizures, myoclonic jerking, reversible paralysis
 Motor abnormalities including flaccidity, depressed reflexes, tremors or fasciculations
 Hyperviscosity and increased risk of blood clot formation
 Dehydration
 Weight loss
 Nausea, vomiting, and abdominal pain
 Weakness
 Low blood pressure with standing

Cause
The main risk factor is a history of diabetes mellitus type 2. Occasionally it may occur in those without a prior history of diabetes or those with diabetes mellitus type 1. Triggers include infections, stroke, trauma, certain medications, and heart attacks.

Other risk factors:
 Lack of sufficient insulin (but enough to prevent ketosis)
 Poor kidney function
 Poor fluid intake (dehydration)
 Older age (50–70 years)
 Certain medical conditions (cerebral vascular injury, myocardial infarction, sepsis)
 Certain medications (glucocorticoids, beta-blockers, thiazide diuretics, calcium channel blockers, and phenytoin)

Pathophysiology
HHS is usually precipitated by an infection, myocardial infarction, stroke or another acute illness. A relative insulin deficiency leads to a serum glucose that is usually higher than 33 mmol/L (600 mg/dL), and a resulting serum osmolarity that is greater than 320 mOsm. This leads to excessive urination (more specifically an osmotic diuresis), which, in turn, leads to volume depletion and hemoconcentration that causes a further increase in blood glucose level. Ketosis is absent because the presence of some insulin inhibits hormone-sensitive lipase-mediated fat tissue breakdown.

Diagnosis

Criteria
According to the American Diabetes Association, diagnostic features include:
 Plasma glucose level >30 mmol/L (>600 mg/dL)
 Serum osmolality >320 mOsm/kg
 Profound dehydration, up to an average of 9L (and therefore substantial thirst (polydipsia))
 Serum pH >7.30
 Bicarbonate >15 mEq/L
 Small ketonuria (~+ on dipstick) and absent-to-low ketonemia (<3 mmol/L)
 Some alteration in consciousness
 BUN > 30 mg/dL (increased)
 Creatinine > 1.5 mg/dL (increased)

Imaging
Cranial imaging is not used for diagnosis of this condition. However, if MRI is performed, it may show cortical restricted diffusion with unusual characteristics of reversible T2 hypointensity in the subcortical white matter.

Differential diagnosis
The major differential diagnosis is diabetic ketoacidosis (DKA). In contrast to DKA, serum glucose levels in HHS are extremely high, usually greater than 40-50 mmol/L (600 mg/dL). Metabolic acidosis is absent or mild. A temporary state of confusion (delirium) is also more common in HHS than DKA. HHS also tends to affect older people more. DKA may have fruity breath, and rapid and deep breathing.

DKA often has serum glucose level greater than 300 mg/dL (HHS is >600 mg/dL). DKA usually occurs in type 1 diabetics whereas HHS is more common in type 2 diabetics. DKA is characterized by a rapid onset, and HHS occurs gradually over a few days. DKA also is characterized by ketosis due to the breakdown of fat for energy.

Both DKA and HHS may show symptoms of dehydration, increased thirst, increased urination, increased hunger, weight loss, nausea, vomiting, abdominal pain, blurred vision, headaches, weakness, and low blood pressure with standing.

Management

Phases and timelines 
The JBDS HHS care pathway comprises 3 main themes to consider when managing a patient with HHS:

 clinical assessment and monitoring
 interventions
 assessments and prevention of harm

To streamline management, there are 5 phases of therapy from the time of recognition of the condition to resolution:

 0–60 min
 1–6 hours
 6–12 hours
 12–24 hours
 24–72 hours

Intravenous fluids
Treatment of HHS begins with reestablishing tissue perfusion using intravenous fluids. People with HHS can be dehydrated by 8 to 12 liters. Attempts to correct this usually take place over 24 hours with initial rates of normal saline often in the range of 1 L/h for the first few hours or until the condition stabilizes.

Electrolyte replacement
Potassium replacement is often required as the metabolic problems are corrected. It is generally replaced at a rate 10 mEq per hour as long as there is adequate urinary output.

Insulin

Insulin is given to reduce blood glucose concentration; however, as it also causes the movement of potassium into cells, serum potassium levels must be sufficiently high or dangerously low blood potassium levels may result. Once potassium levels have been verified to be greater than 3.3 mEq/L, then an insulin infusion of 0.1 units/kg/hr is started. The goal for resolution is a blood glucose of less than 200 mg/dL.

References

External links

Medical emergencies
Diabetes
Wikipedia medicine articles ready to translate
Wikipedia emergency medicine articles ready to translate